Jean Ferreira Narde commonly known as Jean (born 18 November 1979) is a Brazilian former footballer.

Club career
Jean spend his early years at São Paulo, when he plays from 1998 to 2003. He move to Russia, when he played for FC Saturn, Dynamo Moscow and Rubin Kazan. Jean returned to Brazil in 2008 loaned to Grêmio. After spend most part of the season in the substitutes, Jean leave the club in December and signed a two-year contract with Série B champions Corinthians.

Flamengo career statistics
(Correct )

according to combined sources on the Flamengo official website and Flaestatística.

Honours
 São Paulo
São Paulo State League: 1998, 2000
Torneio Rio-São Paulo: 1998, 2002
 Corinthians
São Paulo State League: 2009
 Flamengo
Taça Guanabara: 2011
Taça Rio: 2011
Rio de Janeiro State League: 2011

References

External links
  Player page on the Brazilian Football Confederation website

1979 births
People from Feira de Santana
Sportspeople from Bahia
Living people
Brazilian footballers
Association football central defenders
São Paulo FC players
FC Saturn Ramenskoye players
FC Dynamo Moscow players
FC Rubin Kazan players
Grêmio Foot-Ball Porto Alegrense players
Sport Club Corinthians Paulista players
FC Moscow players
CR Flamengo footballers
Esporte Clube Vitória players
Guangdong Sunray Cave players
Paysandu Sport Club players
São José Esporte Clube players
Russian Premier League players
Campeonato Brasileiro Série A players
Campeonato Brasileiro Série B players
China League One players
Brazilian expatriate footballers
Expatriate footballers in Russia
Brazilian expatriate sportspeople in Russia
Expatriate footballers in China
Brazilian expatriate sportspeople in China